Maple Grove is an unincorporated community in Seneca County, in the U.S. state of Ohio.

History
Maple Grove was originally called Linden. A post office called Maple Grove was established in 1885, and remained in operation until 1955.

References

Unincorporated communities in Seneca County, Ohio
Unincorporated communities in Ohio